A constitutional referendum was held in the Batavian Republic in 1798. After a previous referendum in 1797 resulted in a coup d'état, a new constitution was written. On 23 April 1798, a referendum was held about the new constitution. Only opponents of the federalists were allowed to vote.

After the referendum, a new coup d'état was done by the Unitarians, and the constitution became effective in July 1798. The French, who had a big influence in the Batavian Republic, were not satisfied with the 1798 constitution, so a new constitution was written, for which a referendum in 1801 was organized.

Results

References

1798
1798 referendums
Constitutional referendum
Constitutional referendums